Robert Joy (born August 17, 1951) is a Canadian actor. He is best known for his role as medical examiner Sid Hammerback on the police procedural series CSI: NY, and his appearances in the films Atlantic City (1980), Ragtime (1981), Desperately Seeking Susan (1985), Land of the Dead (2005), and The Hills Have Eyes (2006). He is a two-time Genie Award nominee for Best Supporting Actor; for Atlantic City and Whole New Thing.

Joy has also worked extensively on the stage, particularly in Shakespearean productions, in both Canada and the United States. Earlier in his career, he was closely affiliated with Newfoundland comedy troupe CODCO.

Early life
Joy was born in Montreal, Quebec, Canada and grew up in St. John's, Newfoundland. He is the son of Flora Louise (née Pike) and Dr. Clifton Joseph Joy, a physician and politician. He attended Corpus Christi College, Oxford, on a Rhodes Scholarship and Memorial University of Newfoundland.

Career
Joy played Madonna's punk musician boyfriend Jim in 1985's Desperately Seeking Susan, and the Dutch-Israeli Hans in the 1986 Alliance/CTV production Sword of Gideon, an adaptation of George Jonas's book Vengeance.

In 1998, he appeared in Gregory Hoblit's thriller Fallen, where he fit into the all-star cast that included Denzel Washington, Donald Sutherland, James Gandolfini, and John Goodman. In 2005, he had a lead role as the simple-minded sharpshooter Charlie Houx in George A. Romero's zombie film Land of the Dead.

In the fall of 2005, Joy joined the CBS police procedural series CSI: NY during its second season as a recurring character, Dr. Sid Hammerback, the Chief Medical Examiner, and became a main cast member in season five. Joy stated, "I basically read the script and then look up everything on Wikipedia that I don't know, and try to find out how to pronounce all the long words and get my head around actually what it is that I'm conveying, because often my character has a lot of explaining to do."

In 2006, Joy appeared onscreen in Alexandre Aja's remake of The Hills Have Eyes where he portrays a mutant named Lizard. He also starred as Ted Bedworth, father of Samaire Armstrong's character Nell Bedworth, in the 2006 romantic comedy It's a Boy Girl Thing. In 2007, Joy played the character of Colonel Stevens in Aliens vs. Predator: Requiem. He appeared as Dr. Stephen Hawking in the comedy Superhero Movie in 2008.

In addition to his acting, Joy was frequently associated with the Newfoundland-based CODCO, working with the comedy troupe on many of their pre-television stage shows and appearing as a guest performer in the series. He also co-starred in the 1986 Andy Jones film, The Adventure of Faustus Bidgood, the only film that features the entire cast of CODCO.

He appeared as himself in the 2012 documentary film That Guy... Who Was in That Thing.

Joy has had on-going stage engagements on Broadway and throughout US, most recently appearing as Charles in King Charles III at Shakespeare Theatre Company in Washington, DC (February 7 - March 18, 2017). and as Crito and the poet Mellitus in “Socrates” at The Public Theater, New York, NY, which ran from April through June 3, 2019.

Personal life
Joy is divorced from actress Mary Joy. They have one daughter, Ruby Joy, who is an actress. In the summer of 2011, Joy and his daughter performed together in Shakespeare's The Tempest. Joy was formerly the partner of actor William Duff-Griffin, who died from prostate cancer on November 13, 1994, and has been in a relationship with Broadway composer Henry Krieger since 1995.

Filmography

Film

Television

References

External links

1951 births
20th-century Canadian male actors
21st-century Canadian male actors
Alumni of Corpus Christi College, Oxford
Anglophone Quebec people
Canadian male film actors
Canadian male television actors
Canadian male voice actors
Canadian male video game actors
Canadian gay actors
Living people
Male actors from Montreal
Male actors from Newfoundland and Labrador
Memorial University of Newfoundland alumni
Newfoundland Rhodes Scholars
People from St. John's, Newfoundland and Labrador
21st-century Canadian LGBT people
20th-century Canadian LGBT people